Barababaraba (Baraba-Baraba), or Baraparapa, is an extinct Indigenous Australian language once spoken along the southern tributaries of the Murrumbidgee River, Victoria and New South Wales. It was a dialect of Wemba–Wemba.

References

External links 
 Bibliography of Baraba Baraba language and people resources, at the Australian Institute of Aboriginal and Torres Strait Islander Studies

Extinct languages of New South Wales 
Kulin languages